Sandro Rafael Ferreira Costa (born 23 September 1995) is a Portuguese professional footballer who plays for SC Vianense as a central defender.

Club career

Gil Vicente
Born in Barcelos, Braga District, Costa played youth football with S.C. Braga and Gil Vicente FC, joining the latter's academy at the age of 14. He made his senior debut with Vilaverdense F.C. in the lower leagues.

Costa's first match in the Segunda Liga with Gil occurred on 8 August 2015, when he featured the entire 1–1 home draw against C.D. Mafra. In January 2016, he was voted the competition's best young player.

Rieti
On 30 July 2018, Costa signed a two-year contract with Italian Serie C club F.C. Rieti. He did not appear in any competitive games due to a serious cruciate ligament injury, and left by mutual consent on 15 May 2019.

References

External links

1995 births
Living people
People from Barcelos, Portugal
Sportspeople from Braga District
Portuguese footballers
Association football defenders
Liga Portugal 2 players
Campeonato de Portugal (league) players
S.C. Braga players
Gil Vicente F.C. players
Vilaverdense F.C. players
C.D. Pinhalnovense players
SC Vianense players
F.C. Rieti players
Portuguese expatriate footballers
Expatriate footballers in Italy
Portuguese expatriate sportspeople in Italy